Ted Adel is a Canadian politician, who was elected to the Legislative Assembly of Yukon in the 2016 election. He represented the electoral district of Copperbelt North as a member of the Yukon Liberal Party untl his defeat in the 2021 Yukon general election.

Adel worked for Canada Post and held executive positions within the Canadian Union of Postal Workers before retiring in 2007. He worked as a real estate agent and for the Yukon Liquor Corporation before entering territorial politics.

He has a bachelor of arts from Wilfrid Laurier University.

Adel first ran unsuccessfully in the rural riding of Mount Lorne-Southern Lakes for the Yukon Liberal Party in the 2011 Yukon election, losing to New Democrat Kevin Barr. Adel was elected on November 7, 2016 as MLA for the Whitehorse riding of Copperbelt North as part of the Liberal majority government, narrowly defeating Yukon Party president Pat McInroy. He served as a member of the Standing Committee on Public Accounts, the Standing Committee on Rules, Elections and Privileges, the Standing Committee on Statutory Instruments and the Standing Committee on Appointments to Major Government Boards and Committees.

Electoral record

2016 general election

|-

| Liberal
| Ted Adel
| align="right"| 566
| align="right"| 45.1%
| align="right"| +10.8%

| NDP
| André Bourcier
| align="right"| 161
| align="right"| 12.8%
| align="right"| -0.6%

|-
! align=left colspan=3|Total
! align=right| 1256
! align=right| 100.0%
! align=right| –
|}

2011 general election

|-

| NDP
| Kevin Barr
| align="right"| 488
| align="right"| 46.8%
| align="right"| –

| Liberal
| Ted Adel
| align="right"| 111
| align="right"| 10.6%
| align="right"| –
|-

| First Nations Party
| Stanley James
| align="right"| 49
| align="right"| 4.7%
| align="right"| –
|-
! align=left colspan=3|Total
! align=right| 1043
! align=right| 100.0%
! align=right| –
|}

References

Yukon Liberal Party MLAs
Living people
Politicians from Whitehorse
21st-century Canadian politicians
Year of birth missing (living people)
Canadian Union of Postal Workers